The following page lists most of the power stations in the electricity sector in Germany. For traction current, see List of installations for 15 kV AC railway electrification in Germany, Austria and Switzerland.

Nuclear

Thermal

Hydroelectric

Pumped-storage hydroelectric

Wind power

Photovoltaic

See also 

 List of power stations in Europe
 List of largest power stations in the world
 Map of large CHP Plants under construction / in planning. Source: Enerlytics Press Release Dec. 12 2011 
 Map of new coal and natural gas power plants in planning . Source: Enerlytics Kraftwerke Invest May 18 2012

References 

Germany

Lists of buildings and structures in Germany